Ronald Wyn Davies (born 20 March 1942) is a Welsh former professional footballer who made over 550 Football League appearances in the 1960s and 1970s, and who was also capped by Wales.

Domestic career
Although he began his career with Wrexham, followed by a successful few seasons for Bolton Wanderers, Davies (nicknamed Wyn the Leap) is perhaps best known for playing for Newcastle United between 1966 and 1971. He was notably part of their Inter-Cities Fairs Cup-winning team of 1969. He later played for Manchester City, signing prior to the 1971–72 season for £60,000, playing as City won the 1972 FA Charity Shield. He then moved from Maine Road to Old Trafford when he was signed by Manchester United manager, Frank O'Farrell on 14 September 1972. He was partnered with another O'Farrell signing, Ted MacDougall. Davies made his league debut for United on 23 September 1972 against champions Derby County at Old Trafford. He  scored the opening goal for United in a 3–0 win.

Blackpool signed Davies for £14,000 on 14 June 1973, and he made his debut for the club on 25 August in a 2–2 draw against West Bromwich Albion, the opening League game of the season.

On 30 June 1975, Blackpool granted him a free transfer and he joined Stockport County. He also played for Crewe Alexandra before finishing his career with Bangor City.

International career
In total, Davies earned 34 caps and scored six goals for Wales. His last appearance came against Poland in Katowice on 26 September 1973.

References

Bibliography

1942 births
Living people
People from Caernarfon
Sportspeople from Gwynedd
Welsh footballers
Wales under-23 international footballers
Wales international footballers
English Football League players
Association football forwards
Wrexham A.F.C. players
Bolton Wanderers F.C. players
Newcastle United F.C. players
Manchester City F.C. players
Manchester United F.C. players
Blackpool F.C. players
Crystal Palace F.C. players
Stockport County F.C. players
Crewe Alexandra F.C. players
Bangor City F.C. players